Beompae (also written pomp'ae or pŏmp'ae) is a Korean genre of Buddhist chants and songs., one of three key traditional Korean song types, together with gagok and pansori.

Description 

There are three kinds of beompae:

 anchaebi sori, "indoor chant", musically simple, sutra chants, mainly in Chinese, sung by a monk, usually inside a temple.
 baggatchaebi sori, "outdoor chant", the solemn recitation of specific Chinese poems, either as hotsori "simple chant", or jitsori "long chant". Sung in a characteristic high pitch by a trained professional singer and monk, for special ritual occasions. The term boempae sometimes refers specifically to these kinds of chants, the most ancient of Korean Buddhist ritual chants.
 hwacheong, secular Buddhist ritual chants, in vernacular Korean, easily understood by listeners.

History 

Beompae developed since the Three Kingdoms period, when Buddhism enjoyed official patronage as Korea's dominant religion. It declined during the Joseon Dynasty, when Confucianism was promoted, and during the Japanese era, when Korea's traditional Buddhist culture was repressed.

See also 

 Culture of Korea
 Korean music

References

External links 

 "A Short History of Pomp'ae: Korean Buddhist Ritual Chant", by Byong Won Lee, Journal of Korean Studies, Volume 1, Number 2, January–June 1971, pp. 109–121.
 "PŎMP'AE" (from Byong Won Lee, Buddhist Music of Korea, Seoul: Jung Eum Sa, 1987), Korea: A Historical and Cultural Dictionary, by Keith L. Pratt, Richard Rutt, Psychology Press, 1999, p. 354.
 "Religious Music : Buddhism", by Byong Won Lee, from Music of Korea, edited by Byong Won Lee & Yong-shik Lee. Seoul: National Center for Korean Traditional Performing Arts, 2007, p. 145.

Korean music
Korean styles of music